Miklós Herczeg (born 26 March 1974) is a Hungarian football player.

He represented the Hungarian national team at the 1996 Summer Olympics in Atlanta, where Hungary failed to progress from the group stage. He played as an attacker.

Clubs
1990–1995 :  ETO Győr
1995–1996 :  Soproni
1995–1999 :  Újpest
1999–2000 :  ETO Győr
2000–2002 :  Újpest
2002–2003 :  ETO Győr
2004 :  DAC Dunajská Streda
2004–2005 :  Honvéd Budapest
2005–2006 :  Lombard-Pápa
2006–2007 :  Integrál-DAC
2008–2009 :  Ebergassing
2009–2010 :  TJ Družstevník Okoč – Sokolec

References

1974 births
Living people
Hungarian footballers
Hungary international footballers
Footballers at the 1996 Summer Olympics
Olympic footballers of Hungary
Nemzeti Bajnokság I players
Győri ETO FC players
Budapest Honvéd FC players
Újpest FC players
Lombard-Pápa TFC footballers
FC DAC 1904 Dunajská Streda players
2. Liga (Slovakia) players
Hungarian expatriate footballers
Hungarian expatriate sportspeople in Slovakia
Hungarian expatriate sportspeople in Austria
Expatriate footballers in Slovakia
Expatriate footballers in Austria
Association football forwards
Győri ETO FC managers
Hungarian football managers